Sugartit (formerly known as Pleasant Ridge and later as Gunpowder in the 1920s) is a rural community in Boone County, Kentucky, United States. It was located at the intersection of U.S. Route 42 and Kentucky Route 237 between the cities of Florence and Union. Sugartit has been noted for its unusual place name.

The community no longer exists and has mostly been annexed into Florence. The last surviving structure was the Sugartit Asphalt factory.

Etymology
According to one account, the community received the name Sugartit because the local men would go to its general store during the winter months, when less farm work was needed, and return home late for dinner; their wives would remark that they "had to have a sugartit at the store".

History
In 1883, when the community was named Pleasant Ridge, amenities and services included a blacksmith, a general store/paint store, the Pleasant Ridge School, a steam saw and grist mill.

During the time it was named Gunpowder in the 1920s and onward, the community had a post office and general store and a blacksmith shop. Both ceased to exist sometime after the mid 1900s.

In the mid 1960s, few businesses existed, with the Sugartit Asphalt Company and Haines Oil being the only remaining businesses. 

Since the 2000s, suburban development from Florence has encroached the former settlement.  Today, the Sugartit area “has several businesses and amenities on Route 42, such as fast food restaurants, a gas station, a car wash, banks, apartments, a body shop, hardware, a church, a pub and other establishments. Additionally, Tri-State Running Company has a store here.

Sugartit never became an incorporated town.

Notes

References

Geography of Boone County, Kentucky
Ghost towns in Kentucky